Petunidin-3-O-glucoside is anthocyanin. It is found in fruits and berries, in red Vitis vinifera grapes and red wine.

See also 
 Phenolic compounds in wine

References 

Anthocyanins